Belotti is an Italian surname. Notable people with the surname include:

Amelia Belotti (born 1988), Argentine handball player
Andrea Belotti (born 1993), Italian footballer
Bortolo Belotti (1877–1944),  Italian politician
Davide Belotti (born 1972), Italian association football coach and former defender
Francis X. Belotti (born 1923), American lawyer and politician
Frank P. Belotti (1898–1972),  Republican California State Assemblyman from 1951 to 1972 
Laura Belotti (born 1966), Italian swimmer
Lino Bortolo Belotti (1930–2018), Italian former Auxiliary Bishop of the Diocese of Bergamo
Marco Belotti (born 1988), Italian freestyle swimmer
George Belotti (1934–2009), American football offensive lineman
Mauro Belotti (born 1984), Italian footballer
Mike Belotti (or Mike Bellotti; 1950), American college football analyst
Valentina Belotti (born 1980), Italian female mountain runner, world champion in 2009

See also
Bellotti, a surname
Bilotti, a surname
Ferrari Belotti, a company

Italian-language surnames